Slemsrud or Vangsås is a village in Hamar Municipality in Innlandet county, Norway. This village is the site of the Øvre Vang Church. Prior to 1992, this area was part of the municipality of Vang. 

References

Hamar
Villages in Innlandet